The municipality of Ombúes de Lavalle is one of the municipalities in the Colonia Department, Uruguay. Its seat is the city of Ombúes de Lavalle.

Location 
The municipality lies in the north section of the department, and limits to its southeast with the Colonia Miguelete Municipality and to its north with Soriano Department.

History 
The municipality of Ombúes de Lavalle was created by Departmental Law N° 014/2013 of 22 March 2013 of the Departmental Board of Colonia, before the proposal of the Intendant of Colonia, following the provisions of the Law N° 18567 and its later reforming Laws.

Territory 
According to the Departmental Law N° 014/2013 the limits of the municipality's territory  match those of the NGA and NGB constituencies of Colonia Department.

Authorities 
The authority of the municipality is the Municipal Council, integrated by the Mayor (who presides it) and four Councilors.

References 

Ombúes de Lavalle